Fraser Lake may refer to:

 Fraser Lake (Nautley River), lake in northern British Columbia, Canada, a source of the Nautley River
 Fraser Lake, British Columbia, a village in northern British Columbia, Canada
 Fraser Lake (Minnesota), lake in Lake County, in the U.S. state of Minnesota
 Fraser Lake (Western Australia), lake in the Australian state of Western Australia